Phước Sơn is a rural district (huyện) of Quảng Nam province in the South Central Coast region of Vietnam. As of 2003 the district had a population of 20,141. The district capital lies at Khâm Đức.

The district was the location of the 1968 Battle of Kham Duc, a major battle of the Vietnam War.

References

Districts of Quảng Nam province